William Geister (March 26, 1876 – January 17, 1942) was an American politician.

Geister was born on a farm in Spring Lake Township, Scott County, Minnesota. He served as the Spring Lake Township clerk. Geister lived in Shakopee, Minnesota. He served in the Minnesota House of Representatives in 1923 and 1924.

References

1876 births
1942 deaths
People from Shakopee, Minnesota
Members of the Minnesota House of Representatives